The 2009 Western Illinois Leathernecks football team represented Western Illinois University as a member of the in Missouri Valley Football Conference (MVFC) during the 2009 NCAA Division I FCS football season. The team was led by head coaches Mark Hendrickson and Don Patterson, who left the team late in the 2008 season due to health problems. The 2009 season was Patterson's last with Western Illinois. He coached the first three games before stepping down, ceding the head coaching duties to Hendrickson. They played their home games at Hanson Field. The team compiling an overall record of 1–10 with a mark of 0–8 in conference play, placing last out of nine teams in the MVFC.

Schedule

References

Western Illinois
Western Illinois Leathernecks football seasons
Western Illinois Leathernecks football